The first season of the ABC American television drama series Revenge premiered on September 21, 2011 and concluded on May 23, 2012, with a total of 22 episodes. The series was created by Mike Kelley and is inspired by the Alexandre Dumas novel The Count of Monte Cristo. The series stars Madeleine Stowe and Emily VanCamp.

Plot
Emily Thorne (Emily VanCamp) comes to the Hamptons, renting a home next to the Grayson family to enjoy a bright summer. However, it is revealed that Emily has been to the Hamptons before as a little girl. In reality, Emily is Amanda Clarke, whose father was framed for a crime he did not commit and sent to prison for life. She was permanently separated from him and never saw him again. Now, she has returned to the Hamptons, intent on getting revenge against those who wronged her and her father, the top of that list being Victoria Grayson (Madeleine Stowe), matriarch of the Grayson family and the woman whom her father loved and who, in the end, betrayed him. 

As she sets her plan in motion, Emily tries to navigate the upper society to destroy those who betrayed her father. But the further she goes, the more her emotions get involved and the more she questions her motives and the moves she makes.

Cast

Main cast 
 Madeleine Stowe as Victoria Grayson
 Emily VanCamp as Emily Thorne/Amanda Clarke
 Gabriel Mann as Nolan Ross
 Henry Czerny as Conrad Grayson
 Ashley Madekwe as Ashley Davenport
 Nick Wechsler as Jack Porter
 Josh Bowman as Daniel Grayson
 Connor Paolo as Declan Porter
 Christa B. Allen as Charlotte Grayson

Recurring cast 
 James Tupper as David Clarke
 Emily Alyn Lind as young Amanda Clarke
 Ashton Holmes as Tyler Barrol
 Margarita Levieva as Amanda Clarke/Emily Thorne
 Amber Valletta as Lydia Davis
 Ed Corbin as Bull
 Max Martini as Frank Stevens
 Cassius Willis as Detective Robert Gunther
 Robbie Amell as Adam Connor
 James McCaffrey as Ryan Huntley
 Hiroyuki Sanada as Satoshi Takeda
 Courtney B. Vance as Benjamin Brooks
 Yancey Arias as Senator Tom Kingsly
 Roger Bart as Leo Mason Treadwell
 Merrin Dungey as Barbara Snow
 James Morrison as Gordon Murphy
 Derek Ray as Lee Moran

Guest cast 
 Veronica Cartwright as Judge Elizabeth Blackwell
 William Devane as Edward Grayson
 Tess Harper as Carole Miller
 Amy Landecker as Dr. Michelle Banks
 CCH Pounder as Warden Sharon Stiles
 James Purefoy as Dominik Wright
 Alicia Coppola as Melissa Robbins
 Cynthia McFadden as herself

Development and production 
In January 2011, ABC ordered the script to pilot. In March 2011, actress Emily VanCamp was cast as the lead character, and shortly afterwards it was released that Ashley Madekwe was cast in the series. Madeleine Stowe and Henry Czerny joined the cast as well. Max Martini and Robbie Amell joined the cast as Frank Stevens, a private investigator and Adam, a wealthy student who is hoping to attend Yale. James Tupper replaced Marc Blucas in the role of Emily's father, after Blucas was forced to drop out due to his commitment on Necessary Roughness. Recurring Gossip Girl star Connor Paolo was cast as a series regular playing the character of Declan Porter. Former Nikita star Ashton Holmes landed a recurring role as Tyler Barrol, a Harvard classmate of Daniel Grayson.

On May 13, 2011, ABC picked the project up to series. On May 17, 2011, ABC announced that the series would air on Wednesday nights at 10:00 pm Eastern/9:00 pm Central in the 2011 fall season.

Episodes

Reception

Critical reception
The first season has been met with generally favorable reviews, with a collective score of 8.3/10 from 37,268 users on IMDb and 65/100 from 20 media reviews on Metacritic.

Dorothy Rabinowitz of The Wall Street Journal praised the series, writing that "The arrival of one pure and unadulterated drama about a passion as old as man is something to celebrate. That's particularly true when that drama is as spellbinding in its satisfyingly gaudy way, as Revenge turns out to be", whilst awarding particular praise to Van Camp for a "beguiling and entirely chilling study in revenge lust." Writing for The New York Times, Alessandra Stanley compared the series favorably with Gossip Girl, concluding that it has "just enough campy suspense to be enjoyable." Episode 5 of the series received particular acclaim, with C. Orlando of TV Fanatic writing that "Revenge took things to a whole new level this week", and noting with reference to the set-up of David Clarke that "Victoria seems the only one with a conscience".

BuddyTV ranked Revenge #3 on its list of 2011's best new TV shows. Yahoo! TV also mentioned the series among the top television programs of 2011.

The series made the covers of Parade, Entertainment Weekly and TV Guide, and was featured in Rolling Stone, Vanity Fair, Vogue, People, Us Weekly, Cosmopolitan, Seventeen, and Teen Vogue magazine. The season finale "Reckoning" was met with critical acclaim by fans and critics as well, calling the episode "the best season finale of 2012".

Ratings
The pilot episode scored a 3.3 Nielsen rating in the 18–49 age demographic and 10.02 million viewers, winning the 10 pm hour time slot against CSI: Crime Scene Investigation and Law & Order: Special Victims Unit. It was reported that Revenge is the highest rated television series in the hour for ABC since Lost. On October 22, 2011, it was reported that Revenge regularly won its hour in the 18–34 and 18–49 age demographics ahead of CSI and Law & Order: SVU.

After a nearly two-month hiatus since February 29, 2012, Revenge returned on April 18, 2012 at No. 1 in the Nielsen ratings and won its timeslot against every other television network with a first-place finish among Total Viewers, Adults 18–49 and Adults 25–54. Revenge won over an original episode of NBC's Law & Order: SVU in Total Viewers (+33%), Adults 18–49 (+53%) and Adults 25–54 (+45%) and generated big year-to-year time-period gains in Total Viewers (+81%), Adults 18–49 (+35%) and Adults 25–54 (+38%), rising over first-run programming on the same night last year. The April 18, 2012 episode attracted ABC's largest audience to the hour since the middle of February sweeps on February 15, 2012.

On April 25, 2012, Revenge won its timeslot for the second consecutive week when the episode rated at No. 1 in the Nielsen ratings among Total Viewers, Adults 18–49, Adults 18–34, and Adults 25–54.

Revenge is ABC’s highest-rated series overall in Wednesday’s 10 p.m. hour in more than 4 years since Lost during the 2006–07 television season.

Ratings

UK Ratings
The first season was broadcast on Monday nights at 9 pm on E4.

aViewers in thousands.
All viewer figures and weekly ranks are from BARB.

Awards
The first season of Revenge was nominated for Favorite New TV Drama at the 2012 People's Choice Awards. Madeleine Stowe received a Golden Globe nomination for Best Actress in a TV drama.

Home media releases
The first season of Revenge was released on DVD on August 21, 2012 in region 1. The set includes all 22 episodes and bonus material such as "Nolan's World: An Interview With The Infamous Nolan Ross"; "Lifestyles Of The Rich And Dangerous: The Making Of REVENGE"; "Hamptons Bound: Preparing For Life At The Shore"; deleted scenes and bloopers.

References

External links 
 
 

Season 1
2011 American television seasons
2012 American television seasons